Lake of the Woods Forest Preserve is a  county park of  in size, located adjacent to Lake of the Woods, Illinois,  USA.  It is operated by the Champaign County Forest Preserve District, a governmental agency of Champaign County, Illinois, and the forest preserve district has built their headquarters in the park.

Museum
The forest preserve is the host site of the Museum of the Grand Prairie, a living history facility that specializes in the human ecology of the former tallgrass prairie townships of eastern Illinois.  The museum features an exhibit on the 1850s-era law practice of Abraham Lincoln, a reconstructed blacksmith shop, and children's museum installations.  As a private-sector lawyer, Lincoln's practice encompassed a circuit of Illinois counties that included Champaign County.

Botanical garden
The forest preserve is also the host site of the  Mabery Gelvin Botanical Garden, a botanical garden located south of the Museum of the Grand Prairie and featuring displays of bedding plants.  In addition, a parcel of forest preserve land has been replanted as the Buffalo Trace Prairie, a replanted tallgrass prairie matching the ecosystem that is celebrated in the museum located immediately to the east.

Facility rentals 
Lake of the Woods allows visitors to rent 7 different facilities as well as wedding rentals at the Mabery Gelvin Botanical Garden. These facilities are available for partial day and full day rentals.

Carillon
The -tall HI-Tower Bell Carillon, which can be climbed by visitors, and a reconstructed covered bridge round out the list of forest preserve attractions.

Access
The nearest limited-access highway exit to the park is Exit #172 on Interstate 74, near Mahomet.

References

Protected areas of Champaign County, Illinois